Hiram is a city in Paulding County, Georgia, United States. As of the 2020 census, the population is 4,929.

History
The Georgia General Assembly incorporated the Town of Hiram in 1891.  The city was named after Hiram Baguette, the town's first postmaster.

Geography
Hiram is located at  (33.865575, -84.774593).

At the intersection of US Highway 278 and Georgia State Route 92, Atlanta's tallest buildings can be seen, specifically the Bank of America Tower, which stands 23 miles away from the junction.

Via GA-92, Acworth is 18 mi (29 km) to the north, and Douglasville is 9 mi (14 km) to the south. Via US-278, Dallas is 8 mi (13 km) to the northwest, and Powder Springs is 5 mi (8 km) to the east.

Demographics

The past decade saw a tremendous increase in the populations of Dallas and Hiram, as well as Paulding County.

Dallas and Hiram more than doubled in population from 2000 to 2010, according to figures from the U.S. Census. Dallas, Paulding's county seat, went from an overall population of 5,056 in the year 2000 to 11,544 in the 2010 census—just over a 128 percent increase.

But Hiram's growth was even more explosive over the last decade, jumping to 3,546 from 1,361—an increase of more than 160 percent.

The county's numbers also swelled, but not at the rate experienced by Dallas and Hiram. From 2000's population of 81,678, the county saw nearly three-quarters of that total adding to its resident count, bringing it to 142,324.

2020 census

As of the 2020 United States census, there were 4,929 people, 1,510 households, and 1,030 families residing in the city.

2010 census
As of the census of 2010, there were 3543 people and 1,538 households residing in the city. The population density in 2000 was 452.5 people per square mile (174.67/km2). The racial makeup of the city in 2010 was 60.88% White, 32% African American, 0.22% Native American, 1.04% Asian, 2.74% from other races, and 3.02% from two or more races. Hispanic or Latino of any race were 7.54% of the population.

There were 481 households, out of which 38.7% had children under the age of 18 living with them, 55.9% were married couples living together, 14.8% had a female householder with no husband present, and 23.7% were non-families. 19.1% of all households were made up of individuals, and 4.4% had someone living alone who was 65 years of age or older.  The average household size was 2.83 and the average family size was 3.20.

In the city, the population was spread out, with 28.4% under the age of 18, 11.4% from 18 to 24, 33.7% from 25 to 44, 19.3% from 45 to 64, and 7.3% who were 65 years of age or older.  The median age was 32 years. For every 100 females, there were 99.9 males.  For every 100 females age 18 and over, there were 96.2 males.

The median income for a household in the city was $50,069, and the median income for a family was $51,705. Males had a median income of $36,048 versus $24,483 for females. The per capita income for the city was $19,254.  About 4.1% of families and 5.2% of the population were below the poverty line, including 6.4% of those under age 18 and none of those age 65 or over.

Transportation

Major highways

  U.S. Route 278
  State Route 92
  State Route 120
  State Route 6
  State Business Route 6
  State Route 360

Education
The city of Hiram has two public schools named after it, Hiram High School and Hiram Elementary School. The nearest middle schools are Dobbins Middle School, P.B. Ritch Middle School and East Paulding Middle School.

Recreation
Silver Comet Trail
Ben Hill Strickland Park
Hiram Ruritan, a private rec center with various ball fields

References

External links

 City of Hiram

Cities in Georgia (U.S. state)
Cities in Paulding County, Georgia